The Toowoomba Anglican School (formerly Toowoomba Anglican College and Preparatory School) is an independent Anglican co-educational primary and secondary day and boarding school located in Toowoomba, Queensland, Australia. The school is a member of the Anglican Diocese of Brisbane and is affiliated with the Junior School Heads Association of Australia.

The school has a small village atmosphere at its  campus on the edge of the Dividing Range, and has developed a variety of facilities on its East Toowoomba location. These include three sporting ovals, an outdoor  swimming pool, a multipurpose court, and the St Aidans School Chapel. It also has a large multi-purpose venue with bleacher seating called the Millennium Centre, where assemblies and other sporting events are held such as volleyball, basketball and netball.

History

The school was founded in 1911 as The Toowoomba Grammar Preparatory School. Original enrolment comprised 17 boys. The school was founded and grew with a boarding focus to service the geographically isolated areas of Southern and Western Queensland. The focus on boarding has remained through the school's history.

In 1927 the campus was expanded with the purchase of the adjacent Stoneleigh House, which was used for boarding students. In 1942–43 the School grounds were commandeered by the Army as a result of World War II, and the school was evacuated to Southport on the Gold Coast. In 1972 the enrolment was expanded to become co-educational. In 1986 Stoneleigh House was demolished to make room for sporting facilities. The turret (known as the Bell Tower) was salvaged through the efforts of the Past Students Association, and to this day is sited between the sporting ovals that replaced Stoneleigh.

In 2001 the school's board was subject of a civil case, S v Corporation of the Synod of the Diocese of Brisbane [2001] QSC 473, involving sexual offending by a housemaster in the 1990s. The events later formed the basis of the 2017 film Don't Tell.

Heads of school

Houses

The school has a day house system for internal competition, and a different house system for boarding.

There are three-day houses: Gill (maroon), Connal (gold) and Fairfax (navy).

Sports

Sports offered at the school include AFL, athletics, basketball, cricket, cross country, soccer, rugby union, rugby league, hockey, netball, softball, swimming, tennis, touch football, and volleyball.

Sporting facilities at the school include three junior-sized ovals, four tennis, and netball courts, an outdoor pool, and a gymnasium (which also acts as the School's assembly hall).

Music

TAS has an extensive music program. The program includes a music exposure system where all students undertake activities using musical instruments such as the violin. The result is extensive participation in small music ensembles through all age groups. TAS enters the annual Toowoomba Eisteddfod amongst other regional competitions, and typically enjoys significant success. The Chapel Choir is noted for its consistently high-performance standard.

The school also encourages participation in musical productions. The annual Preparatory Years musical is a large production with the participation of all students from Years 3 to 6 in all aspects from staging, music and management. The College Musical and College Play take place in alternate years with its most recent production being Guys and Dolls performed at the Empire Theatre, the schools first musical performed at the venue, in August 2022, with a portion of the secondary school performing.

Notable alumni
All previous students are able to join the Past Students Association. Notable alumni include:
 Air Vice Marshal Don Bennett   (1919–20)
 Charles Copeman , Rhodes Scholar 1953; mining industrialist (1941–42)
 Steve Haddan, a sports journalist (1964–70)
 Frank Haly , businessman in finance (1944–47)
 Sally Kehoe, an Olympic rower (1992–98)
 Aeneas John Lindsay McDonnell (1904-1964), an international art critic; recoverer of stolen artwork in post-World War II Nazi Germany (1911–16)
 Bernie Pramberg, a rugby league referee and sports journalist (1952–60)
 Pippa Savage, a national rower (1988–93)
 Alex Smith, a TV reporter and journalist (1972–73)
 Jon Stephenson, a geologist, Antarctic explorer, and academic (1943)
 Dr Stuart Bruce Thorp, academic and documentary maker (1966–73)

See also

 List of schools in Queensland
 List of boarding schools in Australia
 List of Anglican schools in Australia

References

External links
 Toowoomba Anglican School website

Schools in Toowoomba
Educational institutions established in 1911
Anglican primary schools in Queensland
Anglican high schools in Queensland
Junior School Heads Association of Australia Member Schools
Boarding schools in Queensland
1911 establishments in Australia
Queensland in World War II